Alan Tissières (born 31 August 1991) is a Swiss ski mountaineer.

Tissières was born in Praz-de-Fort.

Selected results 
 2010:
 3rd (juniors), Trophée des Gastlosen (ISMF World Cup), together with David Salamin
 2012:
 1st, European Championship, relay, together with Martin Anthamatten, Yannick Ecoeur and Marcel Theux
 10th, European Championship, sprint

References

External links 
 
 Alan Tissières at SkiMountaineering.org
 Alan Tissières , Schweizer Sporthilfe (Swiss sports aid)
 Portrait of Alan Tissières, (German/French video), Schweizer Sporthilfe, March 2011

1991 births
Living people
Swiss male ski mountaineers
People from Entremont district
Sportspeople from Valais